Chumayel Municipality (In the Yucatec Maya Language: “place of seeds") is one of the 106 municipalities in the Mexican state of Yucatán containing (45.99 km2) of land and is located roughly 80 km southeast of the city of Mérida.

History
There is no accurate data on when the town was founded, though it existed before the conquest. At colonization, Chumayel became part of the encomienda system. The town's ancient history is important; one of the few remaining Mayan documents, the Codices of the Chilam Balam of Chumayel, originated here.  

Yucatán declared its independence from the Spanish Crown in 1821, and in 1825 the area was assigned to the lower mountainous partition of Mama Municipality. In 1867 it was moved to the Tekax Municipality and in 1935 it was designated as its own municipality.

Governance
The municipal president is elected for a three-year term. The town council has four councilpersons, who serve as Secretary and councilors of public security, public lighting and nomenclature.

The Municipal Council administers the business of the municipality. It is responsible for budgeting and expenditures and producing all required reports for all branches of the municipal administration. Annually it determines educational standards for schools.

The Police Commissioners ensure public order and safety. They are tasked with enforcing regulations, distributing materials and administering rulings of general compliance issued by the council.

Communities
The head of the municipality is Chumayel, Yucatán.  There are 5 populated areas of the municipality. The significant populations are shown below:

Local festivals
Every year from 28 April to 3 May the traditional town feast, Holy Christ's Transfiguration, is celebrated.

Tourist attractions
 Church of the Immaculate Conception built in the 16th century
 Hacienda Ucum

References

Municipalities of Yucatán